Hedegaard is a surname. Notable people with the surname include:

Hedegaard (DJ), full name Rasmus Hedegaard, Danish DJ and record producer.
Connie Hedegaard (born 1960), Danish politician 
Lars Hedegaard (born 1942), Danish historian, journalist and author
Lars Hedegaard Andersen (born 1975), Danish cricketer
Martin Hoberg Hedegaard (born 1992), Danish singer, also known by his mononym  Martin
Mikkel Hedegaard, Danish footballer
Morten Hedegaard (born 1972), Danish cricketer